Cyphocerastis elegans is a species of grasshoppers in the family Acrididae found in Africa.

References

External links 
 

Insects described in 1929
Acrididae
Insects of Africa